Atascosa glareosella is a species of snout moth in the genus Atascosa. It was described by Philipp Christoph Zeller in 1872 and is known from the southern part of the United States, including Texas.

References

Anerastiini
Moths described in 1872
Moths of North America